The following lists events in the year 2019 in Nicaragua.

Incumbents
 President: Daniel Ortega 
 Vice President: Rosario Murillo

Events
2018–2022 Nicaraguan protests

Deaths

7 February – Miriam Argüello, politician (b. 1927).

23 April – José Rizo Castellón, politician, economist and lawyer, Vice President (b. 1944).

5 May – Magaly Quintana, historian and women's rights activist (b. 1952).

See also
List of years in Nicaragua

References

 
2010s in Nicaragua
Years of the 21st century in Nicaragua
Nicaragua
Nicaragua